Pumpkin Center may refer to:

Pumpkin Center, DeKalb County, Alabama, a place in Alabama
Pumpkin Center, Morgan County, Alabama, a place in Alabama
Pumpkin Center, California
Pumpkin Center, Orange County, Indiana
Pumpkin Center, Washington County, Indiana
Pumpkin Center, Kentucky
Pumpkin Center, Louisiana
Pumpkin Center, Missouri (disambiguation)
Pumpkin Center, Dallas County, Missouri
Pumpkin Center, Nodaway County, Missouri
Pumpkin Center, North Carolina
Pumpkin Center, Oklahoma (disambiguation)
Pumpkin Center, Cherokee County, Oklahoma
Pumpkin Center, Comanche County, Oklahoma
Pumpkin Center, Muskogee County, Oklahoma
Pumpkin Center, Okmulgee County, Oklahoma

See also
Punkin Center (disambiguation)